Nissan Mindel was a Chabad Hasidic rabbi, author, editor, and served on the administrative staff of Rabbi Menachem Mendel Schneerson, the seventh Lubavitcher Rebbe.

Background

Nissan Mindel was born in Riga, Latvia in March, 1912, one of nine children, to Yaakov Yitzchak and Bunia Mindel. He left Riga for America by way of Sweden together with the sixth Lubavitcher Rebbe, Rabbi Yosef Yitzchak Schneersohn and his entourage, arriving at New York in March 1940, and settled at Long Beach where he was one of the founders of the Young Israel of Long Beach. He died in Crown Heights, Brooklyn in 1999.

Mindel served on the staff of the Lubavitcher Rebbe, Rabbi Menachem Mendel Schneerson. Nissan Mindel recorded a great deal of Chabad history and helped edit the memoirs of the sixth Lubavitcher Rebbe, Rabbi Yosef Yitzchak.

Education
Mindel received his B.A. and M.A. from University of Manchester in England. In 1962 he earned a PhD in philosophy from Columbia University in New York.

Published works
Mindel authored works published by Chabad's Kehot Publication Society including the first official translation of the Tanya in English. His works include:

The Tanya – the official Chabad English translation of Schneur Zalman of Liadi's Tanya
Rabbi Schneur Zalman of Liadi – a biography of the Chabad movement's founder
The Philosophy of Chabad – a work exploring the central topics of Chabad philosophy
The Lubavitcher Rebbe’s Memoirs – a three-volume work tracing the roots of the Chabad movement
The Letter and the Spirit – a compilation of the English correspondence of Rabbi Menachem Mendel Schneerson, covering a range of Jewish topics
Talks and Tales a monthly magazine for children
My Prayer – a two-volume work on Jewish prayer
Our People – a multi-volume work on Jewish history
The Storyteller – a collection of Jewish children stories
The Call of the Shofar – a book of Jewish children stories
The Complete Festival Series – a multi-volume work on the Jewish holidays
The Commandments – a short philosophical treatise on the Commandments

References

External links
Articles by Nissan Mindel on Chabad.org

Chabad-Lubavitch rabbis
1912 births
1999 deaths
Hebrew–English translators
Latvian male writers
Jewish religious writers
Jewish American writers
Artists from Riga
Alumni of the University of Manchester
Columbia Graduate School of Arts and Sciences alumni
Latvian Orthodox rabbis
Latvian emigrants to the United States